Cozi TV (stylized on-air as COZI TV) is an American free-to-air television network owned by the NBC Owned Television Stations division of NBCUniversal. The network airs classic television series from the 1960s to the 2000s.

The network originated as a local news and lifestyle programming format that was launched between 2009 and 2011 and was seen on digital subchannels operated by nine owned-and-operated stations television stations of the NBC television network in the United States under the brand NBC Nonstop. The sitcoms and drama series now appearing on Cozi are primarily from the NBCUniversal Television Distribution program library. Cozi is also available via cable television, Dish Network, AT&T U-verse, DirecTV and streaming services YouTube TV, Hulu + Live TV and LocalBTV.

History

NBC Nonstop
After NBCUniversal shut down NBC Weather Plus in December 2008 (shortly after the company, along with Blackstone Group and Bain Capital, purchased The Weather Channel), the company's flagship WNBC in New York City replaced Weather Plus' successor, automated local weather service, NBC Plus, on digital subchannel 4.2 on March 9, 2009, with NBC New York Nonstop, a channel that featured a mix of locally produced news and lifestyle programming.

In June 5, 2010, NBC Local Media appointed former WNBC General manager Tom O'Brien in the newly created position of Executive vice president of Nonstop Network. In October, WNBC sister stations WCAU and WRC-TV respectively launched their own versions of the Nonstop channel in the Philadelphia and Washington, D.C. markets. Chicago's WMAQ-TV launched its own local version in November 2010. NBC's three owned-and-operated stations in California (KNBC in Los Angeles, KNTV in San Jose, California-San Francisco and KNSD in San Diego) collaborated to launch the only regional Nonstop channel, NBC California Nonstop, in January 2011; Nonstop channels were also launched by KXAS-TV in Dallas-Fort Worth, Texas and WTVJ in Miami that same month. Each station's Nonstop subchannel carried eight hours of locally produced programming (usually in the form of additional local newscasts exclusive to the subchannel that were produced by each station for their respective market, and some lifestyle or talk-oriented programs), along with core programming from affiliated production company LXTV (such as Talk Stoop, First Look and Open House – the latter two of which were later picked up by NBC for its Saturday late-night lineup).

Cozi TV
In October 2011, NBC Station hired Meredith McGinn as a vice president to leading the development and launch of the network.
On November 3, 2011, NBC Owned Television Stations announced that its seven local Nonstop subchannels would become a single national network under the proposed name NBC Nonstop Network (also to have been called NBC Nonstop or Nonstop Network); the format of the national network was originally planned to feature a format similar to the local Nonstop channels, which would have placed the network in direct competition with the Live Well Network. An NBC executive indicated that the independently formatted Nonstop channels were performing well, but needed separate programming. NBC stated that the network would carry reruns of classic television series during daytime hours and lifestyle programming at night, and that local stations would be able to preempt the national Nonstop Network programming to carry their own local content. By July 2012, it was announced that NBC was considering using a different name for the national network, with "Bob TV" among the names being put under consideration.

On October 17, 2012, Time Out reported that NBCUniversal would launch a new classic television network (similar to MeTV) called Cozi TV. This turned out to actually be the new name of the retooled national version of NBC Nonstop. NBC soft launched Cozi TV on its owned-and-operated stations as well as some charter affiliates on December 20, 2012; the network officially launched on January 1, 2013.  McGinn was promoted to Senior vice president of Cozi TV and LXTV in July 2013.

Programming
Cozi TV permits its local affiliates the option of preempting up to 13 hours of the network's programming each week in order to carry newscasts or other locally produced programming (though some stations without local in-studio operations instead choose to carry additional paid programming); this is a remnant of the format originated by NBC Nonstop, in which most of NBC's O&Os carried additional newscasts on their Nonstop subchannels. Since 2017, the network also carries The More You Know E/I block which airs on NBC Saturday mornings from Litton Entertainment on late Sunday mornings to allow their affiliates to be free of commitments to purchasing E/I programming off the open market.

Affiliates
NBCUniversal broadcasts Cozi TV in most markets served by a station owned by the NBC Owned Television Stations group, either on subchannels of NBC or Telemundo stations. The network is also available on the digital subchannels of other television stations, primarily those affiliated with NBC. The network is available to stations on a barter basis, in which Cozi TV and its affiliates split the responsibility of selling advertising inventory as well as the commercial time allocated each hour.

The network soft-launched on NBC and Telemundo owned-and-operated stations in most markets, with NBC O&Os carrying the network in most markets where the company owns stations, and Telemundo O&Os carrying it in markets where an NBC does not own a television station. 

The network's initial affiliates outside of the core NBC O&O group included KAIL-TV in Fresno, California, KVOA in Tucson, Arizona, KSNV-DT in Las Vegas and eight Texas stations owned by London Broadcasting Company, including KCEN-TV in Waco, Texas and its semi-repeater KAGS-LD in College Station, Texas, with a total initial reach of 26% of U.S. television households. By July 2013, the network's reach had expanded to 42% of the U.S., or an estimated 47.5 million households with at least one television set, and through affiliation deals with WMFP in Boston, KUBE-TV in Houston and the E. W. Scripps Company's KSHB-TV in Kansas City.

On June 2, 2014, Cozi TV's programming was made available on AT&T U-verse channel 578 and Dish Network channel 82 on a part-time basis, through a deal with LeSEA's Family Entertainment Television (FETV) network. LeSEA's relationship with Cozi TV was extended to its stations on June 17, 2014, when it signed an affiliation deal to carry the network on its stations in South Bend, Honolulu, Colorado Springs, Tulsa, St. Croix and New Orleans (WHMB-TV in Indianapolis was exempted from the agreement due to an existing affiliation contract with Dispatch Broadcast Group's WTHR and WALV-CD).  The network announced a deal with OTA Broadcasting, LLC to affiliate with KFFV in Seattle and WEPA-CD in Pittsburgh. Both deals expanded the network's reach to 60% of the U.S. Those deals expired on June 26, 2017; with WEPA-CD going off the air shortly afterwards, because that station sold its spectrum. ABC affiliate WTAE-TV picked up Cozi TV on January 8, 2018, replacing This TV. FETV now carries its own schedule of acquired programming. 

As of October 2020, Cozi TV is available nationwide on Dish Network channel 253.

List of affiliates

Former affiliates

References

External links
 

Television networks in the United States
Cozi TV
Classic television networks
Nostalgia television in the United States
2009 establishments in New York City
NBC Owned Television Stations
NBCUniversal networks
Television channels and stations established in 2009